Visitation School, also known as Visitation or Vis, is an independent, all-girls, Roman Catholic, college-preparatory, school in Minnesota. It is located in Mendota Heights near Saint Paul. Visitation is a coeducational school for grades Montessori PreK-grade 5, and all-girls for grades 6-12. Visitation is the only all-girls secondary school in Minnesota.

A brother school, Saint Thomas Academy, is located across the street and many classes and after school activities involve both schools. Depending on the sport or activity, some of its rival schools are Cretin-Derham Hall, Breck School, St. Paul Academy and Summit School, and The Blake School.

History 
Visitation was founded by Sisters of the Visitation in 1873, who traveled up the Mississippi River from St. Louis, Missouri at the request of some prominent businessmen in St. Paul who wished for a strong, Catholic education for their daughters. This may have been P. F. McQuillan, whose three daughters attended the school.  It was founded in St. Paul, and later moved to its current location. The current location of the school in Mendota Heights, MN, is the school's fourth location.  Several peacocks have historically resided at the Mendota Heights campus.

The Order of the Visitation of Holy Mary was founded in France in 1610. The founders of the order are St. Francis de Sales and St. Jane de Chantal from whom the order gained its Salesian spirituality.

There are sister school locations in St. Louis, MO and Washington, D.C., as well as monasteries in other areas throughout the U.S. The school is coeducational from preschool through grade 5, but becomes single-gender in sixth grade. Prior to the 2017-18 school year, it was co-ed from preschool to sixth grade, and all-girls from seventh grade onwards. To coincide with this change, Saint Thomas Academy added its inaugural (all-boys) sixth grade. Visitation is the only all-girls Catholic secondary school in Minnesota.

The first graduating class at Visitation had only four members; the class of 2019 is made up of 77 young women.

Athletics 
Visitation offers 13 varsity sports:
Softball
Track & Field
Lacrosse
Golf
Swimming and Diving
Basketball
Ice Hockey
Nordic Skiing
Alpine Skiing
Volleyball
Soccer
Tennis
Cross Country

VISTA Productions 
VISTA Productions is the combined theater troupe of The Convent of the Visitation School and Saint Thomas Academy. They put on three main productions a year, including a fall drama, a winter dance piece/improv show and a spring musical. VISTA Productions also is a participant in the Spotlight Program, a High School Theater Recognition Program sponsored by the Hennepin Theater Trust. In the spring of 2014, VISTA Productions received ten awards from this program including the award for Outstanding Overall Production of a Musical for their production of Shrek the Musical. The next year, their production of "The Drowsy Chaperone" also received numerous awards from Spotlight, once again including "Outstanding Overall Production of a Musical" and "Outstanding Overall Performance of a Musical."

References

External links
Visitation's Official Website
The Robette's Official Web Page

Notes and references

Roman Catholic Archdiocese of Saint Paul and Minneapolis
Visitation schools
Educational institutions established in 1873
Private middle schools in Minnesota
Private elementary schools in Minnesota
Catholic secondary schools in Minnesota
Girls' schools in Minnesota
Schools in Dakota County, Minnesota
1873 establishments in Minnesota